Palad may refer to :

Bukas Palad Music Ministry (literally meaning Open Palm Music Ministry in English) is a Roman Catholic community of young people who compose, record, and perform original Filipino religious music.
Gulong ng Palad (Wheel of Fortune) is a Philippine 50's radio drama series and 1980s soap opera hit.